Ojstri Vrh is a settlement in the Municipality of Železniki in the Upper Carniola region of Slovenia.

Name
Ojstri Vrh was attested in historical sources as Oztriwarch in 1291, Osterwerch in 1457, Osterwarch in 1484, and Osterenburch in 1500, among other spellings.

References

External links

Ojstri Vrh at Geopedia
Ojstri Vrh at Panoramio

Populated places in the Municipality of Železniki